Gordon Wells Shrake (born February 4, 1937) is a former municipal and provincial level politician from Alberta, Canada. He first served as a City of Calgary Alderman from 1971 until 1982 when he was elected as a member of the Legislative Assembly of Alberta, serving from 1982 to 1993.

Alderman
Shrake was first elected to Calgary city council on October 25, 1971. He served as a municipal councilor until resigning after winning a seat in the provincial legislature in 1982.

MLA
While still serving as an Alderman for the City of Calgary, Shrake ran as a Progressive Conservative candidate in the 1982 Alberta general election. He won the electoral district of Calgary Millican defeating New Democrat candidate David Swann by a wide margin. He would run for his second term in office in the 1986 Alberta general election. This race proved to be a lot closer for Shrake as his popular vote was cut in half from 1982. Swann ran against him for the second time doubling his popular vote, but not gaining enough support to win. Shrake would run for a third and final term in the 1989 Alberta general election. He would gain enough popular support to defeat New Democrat candidate Bill Flookes by just over 100 votes. Shrake retired from provincial politics at dissolution of the Assembly in 1993.

References

External links
Legislative Assembly of Alberta Members Listing

1937 births
Living people
Progressive Conservative Association of Alberta MLAs
Calgary city councillors